Tomáš Berdych was the defender of title; however, he lost to Philipp Petzschner in the quarterfinals. Mikhail Youzhny won in the final 6–3, 4–6, 6–4 against Marin Čilić.

Former world no. 7 Mario Ančić played his last professional match of his career, losing in straight sets to Daniel Köllerer in the first round. He would announce his retirement the following year due to recurrence of his mononucleosis.

Seeds

Draw

Finals

Top half

Bottom half

References
Main Draw
Qualifying Singles

Bmw Open - Singles
2010 BMW Open